Grape Creek may refer to:

Grape Creek (Colorado), a tributary of the Arkansas
Grape Creek (Hiwassee River tributary), a stream in North Carolina
Grape Creek, North Carolina, an unincorporated community
Grape Creek, Texas, an unincorporated community